Davit Askurava (born 29 July 1990) is a Georgian male track cyclist, representing Georgia at international competitions. He competed at the 2016 UEC European Track Championships in the 1 km time trial event.

References

1990 births
Living people
Male cyclists from Georgia (country)
Track cyclists from Georgia (country)